Jindřich Mikulec (born 11 May 1928) is a Czech gymnast. He competed in eight events at the 1952 Summer Olympics.

References

External links
 

1928 births
Living people
Czech male artistic gymnasts
Olympic gymnasts of Czechoslovakia
Gymnasts at the 1952 Summer Olympics
People from Zlín District
Sportspeople from the Zlín Region